Like many Twins teams of its half-decade, the 1998 Minnesota Twins neither impressed nor contended.  The team finished with a 70–92 record, with subpar batting and pitching.  The season was not without its bright spots, as individual players had solid seasons and Hall of Fame designated hitter Paul Molitor announced his retirement at the end of the season. Tom Kelly's team had plenty of lowlights, most notably David Wells' perfect game against the team on May 17 at Yankee Stadium.

Regular season

Offense

In 1998, Twins fans witnessed the emergence of Matt Lawton and Todd Walker as major league hitters.  The team believed Walker would be able to fill the void left after the trade of Chuck Knoblauch, who had been traded to the New York Yankees on February 6.  Fans also saw the merciful end to the Twins' Scott Stahoviak era.  Otis Nixon had a surprising year for a 39-year-old, hitting .297 and stealing 37 bases (leading the team).  Molitor's hitting continued its gradual decline from his stellar 1996 campaign, with his average down to .281 and RBIs down to 69.  These numbers were still competent and he was able to retire while playing solid baseball.

Pitching

Bob Tewksbury was the opening day starter for the Twins, the last opening day starter not named Brad Radke until 2006.  Tewksbury, Radke, LaTroy Hawkins, and rookie Eric Milton (acquired in the Knoblauch trade) were in the rotation for most of the year.  Mike Morgan and Frank Rodriguez also started 17 and 11 games, respectively.  While Morgan had an impressive year for a forty-year-old journeyman before being traded in August, Rodriguez's season was a major disappointment.  In his last year for the Twins, Rodriguez went 4-6 with an ERA of 6.56.  This could not have been what the team had in mind when it acquired him for Rick Aguilera in 1995.

Subsequent to that trade, the Twins reacquired Aguilera, and he served as the teams' closer in 1998, earning a respectable 38 saves.  Also in the bullpen, Eddie Guardado, Mike Trombley, Héctor Carrasco, and Greg Swindell had competent seasons.

Defense

In his penultimate year as a major league catcher, Minnesota native Terry Steinbach, then 36, had a mediocre season, with Javier Valentín as his backup.  David Ortiz was projected as the starting first baseman, but was hampered by injuries.  Orlando Merced, Molitor, and Stahoviak saw time at the position in Ortiz's absence.  Walker played second, while Ron Coomer saw a majority of the time at third.  Pat Meares was the starting shortstop, but was unceremoniously dumped by the team following the season.  The outfield consisted of a declining Marty Cordova, Nixon, and Lawton.

Season standings

Record vs. opponents

Roster

Notable transactions
January 14: Signed first baseman/outfielder Orlando Merced as a free agent.
February 6: Traded second baseman Chuck Knoblauch to the New York Yankees in exchange for outfielder Brian Buchanan, shortstop Cristian Guzmán, pitcher Eric Milton, pitcher Danny Mota, and cash.
April 3: Claimed pitcher Héctor Carrasco off waivers from the Arizona Diamondbacks.
May 26, 1998: Pitcher Doug Linton was signed as a free agent.
July 31: Traded Merced and pitcher Greg Swindell to the Boston Red Sox for outfielder John Barnes, pitcher Matt Kinney, and Joe Thomas.
August 25: Traded pitcher Mike Morgan to the Chicago Cubs for a player to be named later and cash.  On November 3, the Cubs sent pitcher Scott Downs to the Twins to complete the trade.
September 29: First baseman Scott Stahoviak granted free agency.
September 30: Infielder Brent Gates granted free agency.  He was re-signed on December 15.

Miscellaneous

In February, Paul Molitor received the 1997 Lou Gehrig Memorial Award recognizing his exemplary contributions in both community and philanthropy. Molitor is the third Twin to receive the award, following Harmon Killebrew (1971) and Kent Hrbek (1991).
The lone representative of the Twins in the All-Star Game was pitcher Brad Radke.
After a 9-for-10 weekend (July 24–26) at the Dome, Todd Walker raised his batting 18 points to take the league lead at .352. He singled in his first July 28 at-bat in Kansas City to tie club records for consecutive hits (9) and consecutive times on base (11). With a chance to set new records, he struck out looking in the fourth inning.
The highest paid Twin in 1998 was Paul Molitor at $4,250,000; followed by Terry Steinbach  at $2,850,000.
Molitor also received the 1998 Branch Rickey Award, given annually to an individual in Major League Baseball (MLB) in recognition of his exceptional community service.  Kirby Puckett, in 1993, is the only other Twin to receive this award.

Player stats

Batting

Starters by position
Note: Pos = Position; G = Games played; AB = At bats; R = Runs; H = Hits; HR = Home runs; RBI = Runs batted in; Avg. = Batting average; Slg. = Slugging average; SB = Stolen bases

Other batters
Note: G = Games played; AB = At bats; H = Hits; Avg. = Batting average; HR = Home runs; RBI = Runs batted in

Pitching

Starting pitchers
Note: G = Games pitched; IP = Innings pitched; W = Wins; L = Losses; ERA = Earned run average; SO = Strikeouts

Other pitchers
Note: G = Games pitched; IP = Innings pitched; W = Wins; L = Losses; ERA = Earned run average; SO = Strikeouts

Relief pitchers
Note: G = Games pitched; W = Wins; L = Losses; SV = Saves; ERA = Earned run average; SO = Strikeouts

Other post-season awards
Calvin R. Griffith Award (Most Valuable Twin) – Matt Lawton
Joseph W. Haynes Award (Twins Pitcher of the Year) – Mike Trombley
Bill Boni Award (Twins Outstanding Rookie) – Eric Milton
Charles O. Johnson Award (Most Improved Twin) – Todd Walker
Dick Siebert Award (Upper Midwest Player of the Year) – Rick Helling
The above awards are voted on by the Twin Cities chapter of the BBWAA
Carl R. Pohlad Award (Outstanding Community Service) – Terry Steinbach
Sherry Robertson Award (Twins Outstanding Farm System Player) – Doug Mientkiewicz

Farm system

References

External links
Diamond Mind's Analysis of the Twins' 1998 season
Player stats from www.baseball-reference.com
Team info from www.baseball-almanac.com
Twins history through the 1990s, from www.mlb.com
1998 Standings

Minnesota Twins seasons
Minnesota Twins
Twins